Robert Montagu (died 1693) was a younger son of Robert Montagu, 3rd Earl of Manchester and Anne Yelverton. He was a knight of the shire from Huntingdonshire from 1689 until his death in 1693.

Year of birth missing
1693 deaths
Robert Montagu
Members of the Parliament of England (pre-1707) for constituencies in Huntingdonshire
English MPs 1689–1690
English MPs 1690–1695
Younger sons of earls